Georges Albert Édouard Brutus Gilles de la Tourette (30 October 1857 – 22 May 1904) was a French neurologist and the namesake of Tourette syndrome, a neurological condition characterized by tics. His main contributions in medicine were in the fields of hypnotism and hysteria.

Early years
Gilles de la Tourette was born the oldest of four children on 30 October 1857 in the small town of Saint-Gervais-les-Trois-Clochers in the district of Châtellerault, near the city of Loudun.

During 1873, Gilles de la Tourette began medical studies at Poitiers at the age of sixteen. In 1881, he relocated to Paris, where he continued his studies at the Laennec Hospital.

Career

Gilles de la Tourette began his internship in 1884, working "at a superhuman pace, publishing, teaching and practicing clinical medicine". He became a student, amanuensis, and house physician of his mentor,  influential contemporary neurologist Jean-Martin Charcot, director of the Salpêtrière Hospital. Charcot also helped him to advance in his academic career. Gilles de la Tourette studied and lectured in psychotherapy, hysteria, and medical and legal ramifications of mesmerism (modern-day hypnosis). Colleagues and historians have described him as a "highly intelligent, if irascible, character".

In 1884, Charcot asked Gilles de la Tourette to work on motor disorders; latah, myriachit, and the Jumping Frenchmen of Maine had recently been described, and Gilles de la Tourette believed the conditions were related and separate from chorea.  He described the symptoms of Tourette syndrome in one patient and collected previous observations of similar cases, and in 1885, he published a further nine cases using the name maladie des tics for the disorder. Charcot renamed the syndrome "Gilles de la Tourette's illness" in his honor, although the work was not well received at Salpêtrière.

Gilles de la Tourette published an article on hysteria in the German Army, which angered Bismarck, and a further article about unhygienic conditions in the floating hospitals on the river Thames. With Gabriel Legué, he analyzed 17th-century abbess Jeanne des Anges' account of her hysteria that was allegedly based on her unrequited love for a priest Urbain Grandier, who was later burned for witchcraft.

Personal life and decline

Gilles de la Tourette married his cousin Marie Detrois (1867–1922) on 2 August 1887 in Loudon. Paul Brouardel and Charcot were witnesses. They had four children, three of whom lived to adulthood.

In 1893, a former female patient, who was later revealed to have psychosis, shot Gilles de la Tourette in the neck, claiming one of his colleagues had hypnotized her against her will. His mentor, Charcot, had died recently, and his young son had also died recently. Although he recovered from the shooting and continued to work and organize lectures, after these events, Gilles de la Tourette began to display symptoms of severe depression. After 1893, his mental health noticeably declined.

In 1901, Charcot's son, Jean-Baptiste, convinced Gilles de la Tourette to travel to Switzerland on a ruse, and had him committed to a psychiatric hospital, where Gilles de la Tourette was diagnosed with tertiary syphilis. His condition worsened and he was forced to resign. His wife and colleagues were not forthcoming about the causes of his internment. He died on 22 May 1904 with advanced dementia at the Lausanne Psychiatric Hospital in Cery from what was labeled a status seizure, and that his wife described as apoplexy.  Lees (2019) states that "Gilles de la Tourette died of general paralysis of the insane (neurosyphilis)".

Writings
Gilles de la Tourette published sixteen papers on hysteria, including:
 Les actualités médicales, les états neurasthéniques (Paris 1898)
 Leçons de clinique thérapeutique sur les maladies du système nerveux (Paris 1898)
 L'hypnotisme et les états analogues au point de vue médico-légal (Paris, 1887; 2nd. edition Paris 1889)
 Les actualités médicales. Formes cliniques et traitement des myélites syphilitiques' convulsifs (La semaine médicale 1899)
 Traité clinique et thérapeutique de l'hystérie d'après l'enseignement de la Salpêtrière (Paris 1891)

Notes

References

Books 
 Walusinski O (2019).  Georges Gilles de la Tourette: Beyond the Eponym, a Biography. Oxford University Press.

External links

1857 births
1904 deaths
People from Vienne
People with mood disorders
People with traumatic brain injuries
French neurologists
Tourette syndrome
French shooting survivors
French medical writers
Amanuenses
19th-century French physicians
Chevaliers of the Légion d'honneur